William Robert Williams (August 11, 1884 – May 9, 1972) was an American politician from New York.

Life
He was born on August 11, 1884, in Brookfield, New York. He moved to Cassville in 1891. He was a salesman with Standard Oil from 1907 to 1910.

Williams was a member of the New York State Assembly (Oneida Co., 2nd D.) in 1936, 1937, 1938, 1939–40, 1941–42 and 1943.

He was Sheriff of Oneida County, New York from 1944 to 1951. He was elected as a Republican to the 82nd, 83rd, 84th and 85th United States Congresses, holding office from January 3, 1951, to January 3, 1959. He was chairman of the Oneida County Republican Committee from 1959 to 1961. Williams voted present on the Civil Rights Act of 1957.

He died on May 9, 1972, in Cassville, New York; and was buried at the Sauquoit Valley Cemetery in Clayville.

References

Sources

External links

1884 births
1972 deaths
People from Oneida County, New York
New York (state) sheriffs
Republican Party members of the New York State Assembly
Republican Party members of the United States House of Representatives from New York (state)
People from Brookfield, New York
20th-century American politicians